Yeon Jei-min (born 28 May 1993) is a South Korean footballer who plays as centre back for FC Anyang in K League 2.

Career
Yeon joined Suwon Samsung Bluewings in 2013 but made only 4 appearances in his debut season.

He moved to Busan IPark on loan in July 2014.

Honours

International
South Korea U-23
 King's Cup: 2015

References

External links 

1993 births
Living people
Association football defenders
South Korean footballers
Expatriate footballers in Japan
South Korean expatriate footballers
South Korean expatriate sportspeople in Japan
South Korean expatriates in Japan
Suwon Samsung Bluewings players
Busan IPark players
Jeonnam Dragons players
Kagoshima United FC players
Suwon FC players
Ansan Greeners FC players
FC Anyang players
K League 1 players
K League 2 players
J2 League players
Hannam University alumni
Place of birth missing (living people)